Zhou Xiaozhou (1912 – December 26, 1966) was a Chinese politician and communist revolutionary, who served as Communist Party Secretary of Hunan from 1953 to 1957. He committed suicide during the Cultural Revolution.

He was born in Xiangtan, Hunan Province. He attended Hunan University, then won a scholarship to continue his studies at Beijing Normal University. He was an agent for the Communists during the Second United Front between the Kuomintang and Communist Party.

After the foundation of the People's Republic of China in 1949, Zhou served as the Communist Party Secretary of his home province between 1953 and 1957. At the Mountain Lu Conference in 1959, Zhou Xiaozhou and his successor, Zhou Hui, along with Huang Kecheng and Zhang Wentian, lent their support to Peng Dehuai in questioning the wisdom of the Great Leap Forward. He was thus branded a traitor, stripped of his positions, and sent to re-education through labour.

In 1962, Zhou was restored to an academic position in Guangzhou, seemingly regaining his political footing.  However, at the outset of the Cultural Revolution, Zhou became an easy target for abuse due to his role in criticizing the Great Leap Forward, and committed suicide by drug overdose at the age of 54. He was posthumously rehabilitated in February 1979, under the leadership of Deng Xiaoping.

1912 births
1966 deaths
People's Republic of China politicians from Hunan
Chinese Communist Party politicians from Hunan
Political office-holders in Hunan
Hunan University alumni
Suicides during the Cultural Revolution
Politicians from Xiangtan
Beijing Normal University alumni
Chinese politicians who committed suicide
Secretaries to Mao Zedong